Daniel Fernandes (born 14 March 1973) is a French judoka.

Achievements

Video 
 Videos on Judovision.org

References

External links
 
 
 

1973 births
Living people
20th-century French people
21st-century French people
French male judoka
French people of Portuguese descent
Judoka at the 2004 Summer Olympics
Olympic judoka of France